Busitema is a settlement in eastern Uganda. It is the location of the Main Campus of Busitema University, one of the public universities in Uganda.

Location
The coordinates of Busitema are:00 34 21N, 34 03 00E (Latitude:0.5725; Longitude:34.0500).

Population
As of April 2010, the exact population of Busitema is not known.

Landmarks
The landmarks within the town limits or close to the edges of town include:

 The Main Campus of Busitema University - The university maintains six other campuses in various locations in Eastern Uganda.
 The Jinja–Iganga–Bugiri–Tororo Road Road - The road passes through Busitema.

External links
 Busitema University Homepage

See also
Busia District, Uganda
Busitema University

References

Populated places in Uganda
Cities in the Great Rift Valley
Busia District, Uganda